Boss Man (stylised in all caps) is the third studio album by American rapper Rich the Kid. It was released on March 13, 2020. It is Rich's only studio album on Republic Records. The album features guest appearances by Lil Baby, DaBaby, Nicki Minaj, Post Malone, Lil Tjay, YoungBoy Never Broke Again, London on da Track, and Quavo. It is reportedly the first part of a two-part project.

Background
Rich shared a countdown on Instagram on February 14, 2020; he had previously announced a new album would come out in March. He then revealed the cover with the written release date on March 3, and revealed the tracklist on March 12. Rich also revealed "V12" from the album features Post Malone and was also solely produced by Malone. Rich the Kid and Tidal held a listening party for the album in New York City on March 12.

Singles
The lead single of the album is "That's Tuff", featuring Quavo. It was released on December 6, 2019. The lead single was originally thought to be "Go Up", featuring Roddy Ricch, a track that was released on July 12, 2019, to celebrate Rich's 27th birthday, which was the day after the release of the song. The second single of the album is "Money Talk",  featuring YoungBoy Never Broke Again. It was released on January 17, 2020. The third single of the album is "Red". It was released on March 6, 2020. The fourth single is "Stuck Together", featuring Lil Baby. It was made as a single on April 1, 2020, due to a remix also including Future.

Track listing
Credits adapted from the album's liner notes.

Notes
  signifies a co-producer

Personnel
Credits adapted from the album's liner notes.

Musicians
 The Choke – trumpet 
        
Technical
 Lloyd "2Fly" Mizell – recording 
 Brandon Wood – recording assistant 
 Ian Gagnon – recording 
 Aubry Delaine – recording 
 Mate Gere – recording assistant 
 Christian Amadeus – recording assistant 
 Jason Goldberg – mixing , recording 
 Thomas "Tillie" Mann – mixing 
 Princeton "Perfect Harmony" Terry – mixing assistant 
 Kamron Krieger – mixing assistant 
 Mike Bozzi – mastering

Charts

References

2020 albums
Albums produced by Cubeatz
Albums produced by London on da Track
Albums produced by Murda Beatz
Republic Records albums
Rich the Kid albums
Albums produced by Post Malone